Louis Lynagh (born 3 December 2000) is a professional rugby union player who plays as a wing or fullback for Premiership Rugby club Harlequins.

Early life
Lynagh was born in Treviso, Italy to an Italian mother and his father is former Australian rugby player Michael Lynagh. At the age of four his family moved to England where he began playing mini rugby at Richmond and attended Hampton School.

Club career
Lynagh joined the academy of Harlequins at the age of thirteen. In October 2020 he made his Premiership debut against Leicester Tigers and later that season scored a try during Harlequins 43–36 defeat of Bristol Bears in the semi-final, a game in which Quins recovered from 28 points down to win. The following weekend on 26 June 2021 Lynagh scored two late tries as Quins defeated defending champions Exeter Chiefs 40-38 in the final at Twickenham to win their first Premiership title for nine years.

International career
Lynagh represented the England under-16 team and in the summer of 2018 was a member of the England U18 side that toured South Africa. In September 2021 Lynagh received his first call-up to the senior England squad by coach Eddie Jones for a training camp.

As Lynagh remains uncapped at senior level, he is eligible to play for three nations: England (residence), Australia (parent), Italy (birth and parent).

References

External links
Harlequins Profile
ESPN Profile
Ultimate Rugby Profile

2000 births
Living people
English rugby union players
Harlequin F.C. players
Italian British rugby union players
People educated at Hampton School
Rugby union fullbacks
Rugby union wings